The list that follows is the Liberal Democrats Frontbench Team/Shadow Cabinet led by Vince Cable, who was acting leader between 15 October and 18 December 2007, following the resignation of Menzies Campbell and prior to the election of Nick Clegg.

Liberal Democrat Frontbench Team

Frontbench Team of Vince Cable
 Acting Leader of the Liberal Democrats, Treasury – Vince Cable
 Foreign and Commonwealth Affairs – Michael Moore
 Health – Norman Lamb
 Home Affairs – Nick Clegg
 Defence – Nick Harvey
 Environment – Chris Huhne
 Transport – Susan Kramer
 Office of the Leader of the House of Commons and Party President – Simon Hughes
 Justice – David Heath
 Innovation, Universities and Skills – Sarah Teather
 Culture, Media and Sport – Don Foster
 Communities and Local Government – Andrew Stunell
 Housing – Paul Holmes
 Work and Pensions – Danny Alexander
 Business, Enterprise and Regulatory Reform – Lembit Öpik
 International Development – Lynne Featherstone
 Northern Ireland and Scotland – Alistair Carmichael
 Wales – Roger Williams
 Cabinet Office and Duchy of Lancaster – Norman Baker
 Office of the Chief Secretary to the Treasury – Julia Goldsworthy
 Chief Whip – Paul Burstow
 Chair of Campaigns and Communications – Edward Davey
 Chair of the Manifesto Group – Steve Webb
 Parliamentary Private Secretary to the Leader – vacant
 Chair of the Parliamentary Party – Lorely Burt
 Leader of the Party in the House of Lords – The Lord McNally
 Office of the Attorney General – Martin Thomas
 Office of the Solicitor General – David Howarth

Other Liberal Democrat Spokespeople
 Treasury – Colin Breed
 Foreign Affairs – Mark Hunter
 Home Affairs – Jeremy Browne, Tim Farron
 DEFRA Team – Martin Horwood (Environment), Roger Williams (Rural Affairs)
 Health – John Pugh, Sandra Gidley
 House of Commons – Sir Robert Smith
 Transport – John Leech
 Business, Enterprise and Regulatory Reform – Lorely Burt
 Women and Equality – Jo Swinson
 Defence – Bob Russell, Willie Rennie
 Work and Pensions – Paul Rowen
 Northern Ireland and Scotland – Alan Reid
 International Development – John Barrett
 Wales – Mark Williams
 Communities and Local Government – Jo Swinson, Tom Brake
 Culture, Media and Sport – Tom Brake, Dan Rogerson (Arts, Culture and Heritage), Richard Younger-Ross
 Children, Schools and Families – Annette Brooke
 Schools – Greg Mulholland
 Innovation, Universities and Skills – Evan Harris
 Deputy Whips – Adrian Sanders, Jenny Willott
 Chair of the Parliamentary Party – Paul Holmes
 London and the Olympics – Tom Brake
 Leader's Parliamentary Private Secretary – Tim Farron

Liberal Democrats House of Lords Frontbench Team
Liberal Democrat peers are also organised into teams broadly corresponding to the areas of Government departments.

 Leader in the House of Lords – The Lord McNally
 Deputy Leaders in the House of Lords – The Lord Dholakia and The Lord Wallace of Saltaire
 Chief Whip in the House of Lords – David Shutt
 Home Affairs – The Lord Dholakia
 Health – The Baroness Barker
 Foreign Affairs – The Lord Wallace of Saltaire
 Europe – The Lord Dykes
 Defence – vacant
 Environment, Food & Rural Affairs – The Baroness Miller of Chilthorne Domer
 Northern Ireland – The Lord Smith of Clifton
 Trade and Industry – The Lord Razzall
 Transport – The Lord Bradshaw
 International Development – Lindsay Northover and The Lord Roberts of Llandudno
 Culture, Media & Sport – The Lord Clement-Jones and The Baroness Bonham Carter of Yarnbury
 Shadow Lord Chancellor – The Lord Goodhart

References

See also
Cabinet of the United Kingdom
Official Opposition Shadow Cabinet (UK)

Cable
Politics of the United Kingdom
2007 in British politics
British shadow cabinets